Malchus (Malchōs) was a Carthaginian general and statesman in the 6th century BCE. It was under his tenure that the systematic conquest of the rest of coastal North Africa by Carthage began.

Biography 
He was sent to Sicily as commander sometime after 576 BC, likely due to the Phoenician (and possibly also Elymian) cities' pleas for help against Greek expansion westward into the island. It is not certain whether Carthaginian troops were already stationed on Sicily beforehand. It's possible that Malchus captured the Greek city of Selinus and the Phoenician colonies of Motya, Panormus and Soluntum during the ensuing battles. Although it remains unclear whether he fought against Pentathlus of Cnidus, legendary founder of Lilybaeum, or the tyrant Phalaris of Akragas, it is safe to assume that Malchus was generally successful with his campaign on the island.

Towards the middle of the 6th century BCE, he waged war against the Libu for control over Libya.

Around 540 BC, Malchus is sent to Sardinia at the command of an army, numbering 80,000 men according to the Roman historian Justin, presumably to support the resident Phoenicians against the indigenous Nuragic Sardinians. With several military victories, he succeeds in establishing Punic settlements on the island. Though after a decisive defeat, he and his remaining troops are exiled by the Carthaginian People's Assembly. In response, Malchus besieges Carthage with his army. During the siege, he has his son Carthalo, who had refused to join his side, seized and crucified. Soon after, he manages to conquer the city and has ten elders, who had advocated for his exile, executed. Eventually, he is nonetheless brought to justice by Mago, among others, for aspiring to the throne and executed.

Bibliography 

 Marcus Junianus Justinus, Epitoma historiarum Philippicarum XIII,7 & XXIV,7,7–15
 Orosius, Historiae adversum Paganos 4,6,8.

See also 

 Sicilian Wars
 Magonid dynasty
 Carthalo, an officer during the Second Punic War
 History of Sardinia
 Military of Carthage

References 

Carthaginian generals
6th-century BC Punic people